Everything's Gonna Be All White is a documentary series that premiered on Showtime on February 11, 2022.

Overview 
The series released a trailer, featuring a trigger warning that says, "Warning: This Trailer May Trigger White People". The series will feature interviews, discussing the experiences of people of color and events such as the 2021 United States Capitol attack, Indian reservations, colonialism, systemic racism and blackface. Amanda Seales, who was cast in the series, said that the series will discuss white fragility.

The series aired in three parts, with a fourth (bonus) episode made only available to Showtime on Demand subscribers.

In a Zoom interview, Sacha Jenkins said that he had been working on the series since around the time of the 2021 United States Capitol attack.

Cast 

 Amanda Seales
 Jemele Hill
 Ibram X. Kendi
 Styles P
 Tamika Mallory
 Nell Irvin Painter
 Favianna Rodriguez
 Nick Estes
 Margaret Cho

Episodes

Reception 
The series has received significant backlash on social media, with many accusing the series of causing divide among Americans and promoting anti-white racism. TheGrio ranked the series as one of the top ten films to watch during Black History Month. According to a report by TheGrio, the series received both positive and negative feedback. Vivienne Germain, a writer for The Harvard Crimson reviewed the series, saying the series lacked depth in the way it discussed racial issues. Daniel Finberg, a television critic for The Hollywood Reporter also reviewed the series, saying the bonus episode outshined the rest of the series. Joe Berkowitz, an opinion columnist with Fast Company compared the series to the film Memento.

References

External links 
 
 

2022 American television series debuts
2022 American television series endings
Race-related controversies
Showtime (TV network) original programming